Jonathan "Jack" Dugan (born March 24, 1998) is an American professional ice hockey winger for the Chicago Wolves in the American Hockey League (AHL) as a prospect to the Carolina Hurricanes of the National Hockey League (NHL).

Early life
Dugan was born on March 24, 1998, to parents Lisa and Joe Dugan. His father Joe played hockey at McQuaid Jesuit High School and Washington & Jefferson College. Growing up in Rochester, New York, Dugan and his family regularly attended collegiate ice hockey games at the Rochester Institute of Technology.

Playing career

Amateur
While being raised in Rochester, Dugan played Tier 1 youth hockey for the Rochester Monarchs program before entering high school. Dugan spent two seasons at McQuaid Jesuit High School where his father served as an English teacher. Although he was offered opportunities within the Ontario Hockey League, Dugan chose to maintain his NCAA eligibility. During his junior year at McQuaid, he helped them win the Division 1 state championship after he tallied 65 points through 24 games. As a result of his play, Dugan was named the 2015 New York High School Player of the Year. Following the 2014–15 season, Dugan transferred to the Northwood School in Lake Placid, New York where he was named to the United States High School All USA Hockey Third Team. In his senior year, Dugan committed to play for Providence College following a season in the United States Hockey League.

Collegiate
During his sophomore season, Dugan led the NCAA in scoring with 52 points and was named to the AHCA First All-American Team and the Hockey East First All-Star Team. He was also one of the finalists for the Hobey Baker Award. Dugan was selected 142nd overall by the Vegas Golden Knights in the 2017 NHL Entry Draft.

Professional
On May 11, 2020, Dugan concluded his collegiate career as he was signed by the Vegas Golden Knights to a two-year, entry-level contract.

Released as a free agent from the Golden Knights following his entry-level contract, Dugan agreed to a one-year, two-way contract with the New Jersey Devils on July 13, 2022. Assigned to begin the 2022-23 season in the AHL with affiliate, the Utica Comets, Dugan posted 11 goals and 27 points in 51 regular season games. On March 10, 2023, Dugan was traded by the Devils to the Carolina Hurricanes in exchange for Zack Hayes.

Career statistics

Awards and honors

References

External links
 

1998 births
AHCA Division I men's ice hockey All-Americans
American men's ice hockey left wingers
Chicago Steel players
Chicago Wolves players
Henderson Silver Knights players
Living people
Providence Friars men's ice hockey players
Ice hockey people from Pittsburgh
Utica Comets players
Vegas Golden Knights draft picks